John Douglas Edwards (26 February 1931 – 23 August 2014) was an Australian rules footballer who played with North Melbourne in the Victorian Football League (VFL) during the 1950s.

Edwards was a fullback and won a Syd Barker Medal in 1956 for North Melbourne's best and fairest player. He also represented Victoria at interstate football towards the end of his career.

After retiring as a player, he became a coach in the VFA for both Coburg and Brunswick. He remained involved in the game as well as a football commentator on TV.

References

External links

Jack Edwards at Australian Football.com

1931 births
Australian rules footballers from Victoria (Australia)
North Melbourne Football Club players
Brunswick Football Club players
Coburg Football Club coaches
Syd Barker Medal winners
2014 deaths
Australian rules football commentators